Anthony Kenneth Barber (25 November 1939 – June 2004) was an Australian boxer. He competed in the men's light middleweight event at the 1964 Summer Olympics.

References

External links
 

1939 births
2004 deaths
Australian male boxers
Olympic boxers of Australia
Boxers at the 1964 Summer Olympics
Place of birth missing
Light-middleweight boxers